Sir Edward Herbert (c. 1591–1658) of Aston in Montgomeryshire, was an English lawyer and politician who sat in the House of Commons at various times between 1621 and 1641. He was Attorney-General under King Charles I.

Origins
Herbert was the son of Charles Herbert of Aston, Montgomeryshire, and was a first cousin of Edward Herbert, Baron Herbert of Cherbury. His grandfather was Sir Edward Herbert (d. 1593) (great-nephew of William Herbert, 1st Earl of Pembroke (1423–1469)), Constable of Aberystwith Castle (16 March 1543–4), High Sheriff of Montgomeryshire in 1557 and 1568, a member of parliament for Montgomeryshire in 1553 and 1556-57, and an Esquire of the Body to Queen Elizabeth I.

Career
He was admitted to the Inner Temple in November 1609 and was called to the bar in 1618. In 1621 he was elected a member of parliament for Montgomery. He was elected MP for Downton, Wiltshire in 1624 for the Happy Parliament and was re-elected in 1626 and 1629.

In April 1640 Herbert was elected MP for Reading and for Old Sarum and chose to sit for Old Sarum in the Short Parliament. He was re-elected MP for Old Sarum in November 1640 for the Long Parliament. Having been appointed Attorney-General he was instructed by King Charles I to take legal proceedings against various members of parliament who had been concerned in the passing of the Grand Remonstrance. The only result, however, was Herbert's own impeachment by the House of Commons in 1641 and his imprisonment.

Later in life he lived in exile with the royal family in Holland and in France, becoming Lord Keeper of the Great Seal to King Charles II in April 1653, an office which he had refused in 1645. He resigned that office the next year.  He died in Paris.

Marriage and progeny
Herbert married Margaret Smith, widow of Thomas Carey of Sunninghill Park, Berkshire and daughter of Thomas Smith of Abingdon-on-Thames and Parson's Green, Middlesex.  Herbert's sons included:
Arthur Herbert, 1st Earl of Torrington (1648–1716);
Sir Edward Herbert (c. 1648–1698).

References

 
 

1590s births
1658 deaths
Edward Herbert
Members of the Parliament of England (pre-1707) for constituencies in Wales
Attorneys General for England and Wales
English MPs 1621–1622
English MPs 1624–1625
English MPs 1626
English MPs 1628–1629
English MPs 1640 (April)
English MPs 1640–1648
High Sheriffs of Montgomeryshire